Dion Godet (born 8 November 1965 in the Bahamas) is a Bahamanian football coach who coached the Bahamian national team. He debuted in 2 matches against Bermuda.

References

1965 births
Bahamian football managers
living people